Richard Carlyle von Biberstein (1 December 1859 - 11 September 1931) was an American architect who designed numerous textile mills. Several of his works are listed on the U.S. National Register of Historic Places.

Biography
He was born on 1 December 1859 in Fredericksburg, Texas to Hermann von Biberstein and Carolina Schuchard. He married Laura Eisfeld Biberstein (1865-1911) and they had a son, Herman von Biberstein (1893-1966). He died on 11 September 1931 in Charlotte, North Carolina.

Works
 Acme-McCrary Hosiery Mills, 124, 148, 159 North & 173 N. Church Sts., Asheboro, North Carolina (Biberstein, Richard C.), NRHP-listed
 Former Nebel Knitting Mill, 101 W. Worthington Ave., Charlotte, North Carolina (Biberstein, Richard C.), NRHP-listed
 Lyerly Full Fashioned Mill, 56 Third St., SE. Hickory, North Carolina (Biberstein, Bowles, Meachem & Reed), NRHP-listed
 Savona Mill, 528 S. Turner St. Charlotte, North Carolina (Biberstein, Richard C.), NRHP-listed
 Southern Asbestos Company Mills, 1000 Seaboard St.. Charlotte, North Carolina (Biberstein, R.C.), NRHP-listed
 One or more works in Spray Industrial Historic District, roughly bounded by Warehouse, Rhode Island, River Dr., Washburn Rd., the Smith River, E. Early Ave., and Church. Eden, North Carolina (Biberstein,R.C.), NRHP-listed
 Belmont Hosiery Mill, 608 S. Main St.. Belmont, North Carolina (Biberstein, Herman V.), NRHP-listed

References

Architects from North Carolina
1859 births
1931 deaths